Sixth-seeded Anabel Medina Garrigues was the defending champion, and successfully defended her title, defeating Katarina Srebotnik in the final 4–6, 7–6(7–4), 6–0.

Seeds
The top two seeds receive a bye into the second round.

Draw

Finals

Top half

Bottom half

External links
Draw and Qualifying draw 

2008, Singles
Internationaux de Strasbourg
2008 in French tennis